Moshe Mann (13 April 1907 – 17 October 2004) was an Israeli military officer who was the first commander of the Golani Brigade.

Biography
Moshe Mann was born in Turka, Austro-Hungarian Empire (today Ukraine). This area became part of Poland after World War I. He immigrated to Mandatory Palestine in 1926 from Lviv, as part of HaShomer HaTzair movement. He lived in a kibbutz near Haifa and participated in the founding of the National Kibbutz Movement. He joined the Haganah and moved to Merhavia.

Military career
Mann was involved in building several pre-state Jewish police and paramilitary organizations, including the Notrim, Hish and Palmach.

He participated in the Haganah's first rifle course and became an instructor. One of his students was Yigal Allon. He was then responsible for commanding the Afula area forces, and from 1939 the entire Jezreel Valley. During this time he worked with Orde Wingate. In 1942 he was tasked with curbing the activities of the Irgun and Lehi in his area under the nickname "Saadya".

With the forming of the military structure of the Haganah from 1946 onward, Mann was appointed to head the newly created Levanoni Brigade, controlling the north of the country. As the 1947–48 Civil War in Mandatory Palestine broke out, the brigade split into two—Golani and Carmeli—and Mann got the command of Golani. One of Mann's first actions as commander of the north was to organize the Jewish pioneers in the Birya affair.

During his tenure as Golani commander he was responsible among other things for the call-up of able men and women into the brigade and HIM in the areas under Golani's jurisdiction, and acquiring arms from the local population for the war effort. The most notable events of his tenure as commander of that brigade were the Battles of the Kinarot Valley in May 1948.

Mann had tensions with the IDF high command after Moshe Dayan was appointed to an unspecified post in the Golani Brigade, technically higher than a battalion commander (a post usually reserved just for the brigade commander), and Moshe Carmel was appointed his superior as commander of the northern front. After Mann's wife Zilka died in an Iraqi air raid on his home village on 31 May 1948, Mann quit the military and returned home.

See also 
Golani Brigade
Battles of the Kinarot Valley

References

External links 
 Biography at the Golani Brigade website  
 Select images left by Moshe Mann found after his death at Ynet 

1907 births
2004 deaths
Haganah members
Israeli colonels
Israeli people of the 1948 Arab–Israeli War
Jews in Mandatory Palestine
Polish emigrants to Mandatory Palestine